The Waxahachie Athletics were a minor league baseball team based in Waxahachie, Texas in 1915 and 1916. With the Athletics preceded by 1914 Waxahachie Buffaloes, the Waxahachie teams played exclusively as members of the Class D level Central Texas League, hosting home games at Jungle Park . The Buffaloes were league Central Texas League champions in 1914.

Baseball Hall of Fame member Ross Youngs played for the 1915 Waxahachie Athletics.

History
The Waxahachie Buffaloes were formed in 1914, playing as charter members of the Class D level Central Texas League, which formed as six–team minor league. The charter members joining Waxahachie in the Central Texas League were the Corsicana Athletics, Ennis Tigers, Hillsboro, Texas, Italy, Texas and West, Texas.

In their first season of league play, the 1914 Waxahachie Buffaloes won the Central Texas League championship in a shortened season. After the Buffaloes and other league members began play on May 10, 1914, the league did not complete the season. The Central Texas League was scheduled to play a split schedule, but the second half was shortened. When the league folded on July 25, 1914, Waxahachie had the best overall record of 35–23 playing under managers Luther Burleson and Dee Poindexter. In the overall standings, Waxahachie finished 4.5 games ahead of the 2nd place West team. The Waxahachie Buffaloes won the first half standings with a 26–15 first half record . West won the shortened second half standings. A playoff was held after the league stopped regular season play. In the playoff, the Waxahachie Buffaloes won the championship, defeating West 3 games to 2. playing home games at Jungle Park.

After winning the championship the previous season, the 1915 Waxahachie Athletics finished last as the Central Texas League reformed. After beginning play on May 17, 1915, the Central Texas League again folded before the season ended. Joining the Waxahachie Athletics in the 1915 Central Texas League were the Corsicana A's, Ennis Tigers, Kaufman Kings, Mexia Gassers and Terrell Cubs. The Central Texas League folded on July 24, 1915, with the Athletics having a 27–34 overall record under manager Anson Cole on that date. The Athletics finished 8.0 games behind the 1st place Ennis Tigers in the six–team standings.

At age 18, Baseball Hall of Fame member Ross Youngs played for the 1915 Athletics, hitting .274 in 106 at bats.

The Waxahachie Athletics played their final season as the 1916 Central Texas League again reformed after folding the previous season. The Athletics finished in 5th place overall after the Central Texas League began their third season of play on April 28, 1916 and disbanded on July 16, 1916. The league members joining Waxahachie in 1916 were the Ennis Tigers, Marlin Marlins, Mexia Gassers, Temple Governors and Terrell Terrors. At 26–35, the Athletics finished 10.0 games behind the 1st place Temple Governors under manager Dee Poindexter, a Waxahachie native. After the season, the Waxahachie franchise permanently folded and Waxahachie has not hosted another minor league team.

The ballpark
The Waxahachie minor league teams were noted to have hosted home games at Jungle Park from 1914 to 1916. Opened in 1909, the ballpark was renovated in 1914 and later hosted spring training for the Detroit Tigers from 1916 to 1918, the Cincinnati Reds in 1919, and the Chicago White Sox in 1921. Today, the ballpark is named Richards Park and is home to the Waxahachie High School baseball team. The ballpark has a Texas Historical Marker and is located at 301 South Hawkins, Waxahachie, Texas.

Timeline

Year–by–year records

Notable alumni

Baseball Hall of Fame alumni
Ross Youngs (1915) Inducted, 1972

Notable alumni
Earl Smith (1916)|

See also
Waxahachie Athletics players

References

External links
Baseball Reference

Defunct minor league baseball teams
Professional baseball teams in Texas
Defunct baseball teams in Texas
Baseball teams established in 1914
Baseball teams disestablished in 1916
1914 establishments in Texas
Waxahachie, Texas
Ellis County, Texas
Central Texas League teams
1916 disestablishments in Texas